Joseph M. Uliana (born November 19, 1965) is an American politician from Pennsylvania who served as a Republican member of the Pennsylvania House of Representatives for the 135th district from 1991 to 1994 and the Pennsylvania State Senate for the 18th district from 1995 to 1998.

Uliana was born in Bethlehem, Pennsylvania. He graduated from Bethlehem Catholic High School in 1983 and received a B.A. from Lehigh University in 1987.

He was elected to the Pennsylvania House of Representatives for the 135th district in 1990 and served from 1991 to 1994.

He had an unsuccessful campaign for U.S. Congress in 1998.  He worked as a lobbyist for Malady & Wooten from 2000 to 2009 and for J.M. Uliana & Associates since 2009.

References

1965 births
20th-century American politicians
Bethlehem Catholic High School alumni
Lehigh University alumni
Living people
Republican Party members of the Pennsylvania House of Representatives
Pennsylvania lobbyists
Republican Party Pennsylvania state senators
Politicians from Bethlehem, Pennsylvania